AppNeta is a computer software company headquartered in Boston, Massachusetts, with research and development based in Vancouver, British Columbia.

History
The company was co-founded in July 2000 by Irfhan Rajani as Jaalam Research and then later renamed to Jaalam Technologies. Its first product was called Appare.Net.

In December 2002, Glenn Wong became chief executive, and in August 2003 the company was renamed again to Apparent Networks, to reflect its product. In January 2004 Wong resigned and Rajani resumed his role as chief.

It is privately held, with venture capital investors, including SolarWinds, Bain Capital Ventures, JMI Equity, Egan-Managed Capital and Business Development Bank of Canada.

In 2008, its headquarters moved from Vancouver to Boston.
Apparent Networks changed their name to AppNeta in 2011.

Customers and partners include Artisan Infrastructure and Bandwidth Management Group.

In July 2014, Matt Stevens, co-founder of AppNeta, replaced Jim Melvin as the company's CEO.

In 2019, AppNeta was named one of Inc. magazine's Best Workplaces for 2019 for fulfilling and willing to go beyond 'just work' to support their employees and their families, making their "work to live" mantra a reality.

On December 07, 2021, AppNeta announced its pending acquisition by Broadcom.

Technology
AppNeta provides software as a service cloud tools that is intended for enterprises, managed service providers and other technology vendors. Enterprises can use the software to manage application and network performance across different branch offices. This technology has also been deployed by managed service providers (MSPs) to monitor their customers’ network performance and generate service revenue.

The company also provides services designed for IT professionals to monitor and analyze network traffic, as well as pinpoint the causes of performance issues in applications including VoIP, Video conferencing, virtualization, and other cloud-based services.

In September 2012, the company released a performance management tool called TraceView, after acquiring Tracelytics. According to AppNeta, this service provides Web application performance management across different application layers and environments.

Awards
 “Best Use of Cloud Delivery” by the Enterprise Management Associates (EMA) Radar™ Report for Application-Aware Network Performance Management (ANPM) Q3 2010.
 "Strong Value" by the Enterprise Management Associates (EMA) Radar™ Report for Application-Aware Network Performance Management (ANPM) Q3 2010.
 "Tech Innovator" by the Xchange Technology Innovator Awards in the managed services category
 "Customer Enhancement Value of the Year 2010" by Frost & Sullivan
 "2010 Excellence Award" by Unified Communications

References

External links
 AppNeta's website

Companies based in Boston
Software companies based in Massachusetts
Software companies of the United States